The Pennsylvania-American Water Company is a utility company in the state of Pennsylvania which provides water and sewage services to more than 2 million people within the state. There are 370 areas served, including the cities of Pittsburgh, Scranton, and Hershey. The company is a subsidiary of American Water Works Co., Inc.

References 

Water companies of the United States